XcodeGhost (and variant XcodeGhost S) are modified versions of Apple's Xcode development environment that are considered malware. The software first gained widespread attention in September 2015, when a number of apps originating from China harbored the malicious code. It was thought to be the "first large-scale attack on Apple's App Store", according to the BBC. The problems were first identified by researchers at Alibaba, a leading e-commerce firm in China. Over 4000 apps are infected, according to FireEye, far more than the 25 initially acknowledged by Apple, including apps from authors outside China.

Security firm Palo Alto Networks surmised that because network speeds were slower in China, developers in the country looked for local copies of the Apple Xcode development environment, and encountered altered versions that had been posted on domestic web sites. This opened the door for the malware to be inserted into high profile apps used on iOS devices.

Even two months after the initial reports, security firm FireEye reported that hundreds of enterprises were still using infected apps and that XcodeGhost remained "a persistent security risk". The firm also identified a new variant of the malware and dubbed it XcodeGhost S; among the apps that were infected were the popular messaging app WeChat and a Netease app Music 163.

Discovery 
On September 16, 2015, a Chinese iOS developer mentioned on the social network Sina Weibo that a malware in Xcode injects third party code into apps compiled with it.

Alibaba researchers then published detailed information on the malware and called it XcodeGhost.

On September 17, 2015, Palo Alto Networks published several reports on the malware.

Operation

Propagation 
Because of the slow download speed from Apple servers, Chinese iOS developers would download Xcode from third party websites, such as Baidu Yun (now called Baidu WangPan), a cloud storage service hosted by Baidu, or get copies from co-workers. Attackers took advantage of this situation by distributing compromised versions on such file hosting websites.

Palo Alto Networks suspects that the malware was available in March 2015.

Attack vector

Origins 

The attacker used a compiler backdoor attack. The novelty of this attack is the modification of the Xcode compiler. However, according to documents leaked by Edward Snowden, CIA security researchers from Sandia National Laboratories claimed that they "had created a modified version of Apple’s proprietary software development tool, Xcode, which could sneak surveillance backdoors into any apps or programs created using the tool."

Modified files 
Known versions of XcodeGhost add extra files to the original Xcode application:
 Core service framework on iOS, iOS simulator and OS X platforms
 IDEBundleInjection framework added on iOS, iOS simulator and OS X platforms
XcodeGhost also modified the linker to link the malicious files into the compiled app. This step is reported on the compiling log but not on the Xcode IDE.

Both iOS and OS X apps are vulnerable to XcodeGhost.

Deployment 
XcodeGhost compromised the CoreServices layer, which contains highly used features and frameworks used by the app. When a developer compiles their application with a compromised version of Xcode, the malicious CoreServices are automatically integrated into the app without the developer's knowledge.

Then the malicious files will add extra code in UIWindow class and UIDevice class. The UIWindow class is "an object that manages and coordinates the views an app displays on a device screen".

The UIDevice class provides a singleton instance representing the current device. From this instance the attacker can obtain information about the device such as assigned name, device model, and operating-system name and version.

Behavior on infected devices

Remote control security risks 
XcodeGhost can be remotely controlled via commands sent by an attacker from a Command and control server through HTTP. This data is encrypted using the DES algorithm in ECB mode. Not only is this encryption mode known to be weak, the encryption keys can also be found using reverse engineering. An attacker could perform a man in the middle attack and transmit fake HTTP traffic to the device (to open a dialog box or open specific app for example).

Stealing user device information 
When the infected app is launched, either by using an iPhone or the simulator inside Xcode, XcodeGhost will automatically collect device information such as:
 Current time
 Current infected app's name
 The app's bundle identifier
 Current device's name and type
 Current system's language and country
 Current device's UUID
 Network type
Then the malware will encrypt those data and send it to a command and control server. The server differs from version to version of XcodeGhost; Palo Alto Networks was able to find three server URLs:
 http://init.crash-analytics.com
 http://init.icloud-diagnostics.com
 http://init.icloud-analysis.com
The last domain was also used in the iOS malware KeyRaider.

Read and write from clipboard 
XcodeGhost is also able, each time an infected app is launched, to store the data written in the iOS clipboard. The malware is also able to modify this data. This can be particularly dangerous if the user uses a password management app.

Hijack opening specific URLs 
XcodeGhost is also able to open specific URLs when the infected app is launched. Since Apple iOS and OS X work with Inter-App Communication URL mechanism (e.g. 'whatsapp://', 'Facebook://', 'iTunes://'), the attacker can open any apps installed on the compromised phone or computer, in the case of an infected macOS application. Such mechanism could be harmful with password management apps or even on phishing websites.

Prompting alert dialog 
In its current known version XcodeGhost cannot prompt alert dialogs on the user device. However, it only requires minor changes.

By using a UIAlertView class with the UIAlertViewStyleLoginAndPasswordInput property, the infected app can display a fake alert dialog box that looks like a normal Apple ID user credential check and send the input to the Command and control server.

Infected apps 
Among all the Chinese apps, IMs app, banking apps, mobile carrier's app, maps, stock trading apps, SNS apps and games were infected. Popular apps used all over the world were also infected such as WeChat, a popular instant messaging app, CamScanner, an app to scan document using the smartphone camera or WinZip.

Pangu Team claimed that they counted 3,418 infected apps.

Fox-it, a Netherland-based security company reports that they found thousand of malicious traffic outside China.

Removal

Neutralizing command and control servers and compromised versions of Xcode 
Since the article of Alibaba and Palo Alto Networks, Amazon took down all the servers that were used by XcodeGhost. Baidu also removed all malicious Xcode installers from its cloud storage service.

Removing malicious apps from the App Store 
On September 18, 2015 Apple admitted the existence of the malware and began asking all developers with compromised apps to compile their apps with a clean version of Xcode before submitting them for review again.

Pangu Team released a tool to detect infected apps on a device, but like other antivirus apps it won't run on a device that hasn't been jailbroken.  Apple does not allow antivirus apps into the iOS App Store.

Checking Xcode version 
Apple advises Xcode developers to verify their version of Xcode and to always have Gatekeeper activated on their machine.

References 

Compilers
IOS malware
Malware toolkits
Mobile malware
Software development
Trojan horses